Svetinci is a settlement in the Municipality of Destrnik in northeastern Slovenia. The area is part of the traditional region of Styria. The municipality is now included in the Drava Statistical Region.

There are two small chapel-shrines in the settlement. Both date to the early 20th century.

References

External links
Svetinci on Geopedia

Populated places in the Municipality of Destrnik